The Milan Metro is the rapid transit system serving Milan, Italy, operated by Azienda Trasporti Milanesi.
It has a daily ridership of about 1.4 million on weekdays.

The first line, Line 1, opened in 1964; Line 2 opened 5 years later in 1969, Line 3 in 1990, Line 5 in 2013, and Line 4 in 2022. The Milan Metro is currently the largest system in Italy for length, number of stations and ridership.

History 

The first projects for a subway line in Milan were drawn up in 1914 and 1925, following the examples of underground transport networks in other European cities like London and Paris. Planning proceeded in 1938 for the construction of a system of 7 lines, but this too halted after the start of World War II and due to lack of funds.

On 3 July 1952, the city administration voted for a project of a metro system and on 6 October 1955, a new company, Metropolitana Milanese, was created to manage the construction of the new infrastructure. The project was funded with ₤ 500 million from the municipality and the rest from a loan. The construction site of the first line was opened in viale Monte Rosa on 4 May 1957. Stations on the new line were designed by Franco Albini and Franca Helg architecture studio, while Bob Noorda designed the signage. For this project both Albini-Helg and Noorda won the Compasso D'Oro prize.

The first section from Lotto to Sesto Marelli (21 stations) was opened on 1 November 1964 after 7 years of construction works. Two trains adorned with Italian flags left at 10.41 a.m. and arrived at the Sesto Marelli terminus at 11.15 a.m., greeted by the notes of the national anthem and the triumphal march of Giuseppe Verdi's opera "Aida". In the same year, in April, works on the second line started.
Passengers on the network grew constantly through the first years of service, passing from 37,092,315 in 1965 to 61,937,192 in 1969.

The green line from Caiazzo to Cascina Gobba (7 stations) opened five years later. During the 1960s and 1970s the network of 2 lines was completed, and both lines had 2 different spurs.

The first section of the third line (yellow), with 5 stations, was opened on 3 May 1990 after almost 9 years of construction works. The line opened just before the World Cup. The other 9 stations on Line 3 opened to the southeast in 1991, and northwest to Maciachini Station in 2004.

In March 2005, the Line 2 Abbiategrasso station (south branch from Famagosta) and the Line 1 Rho Fiera station opened. The intermediate station of Pero opened in December 2005. A north extension of Line 3 to Comasina (4 stations) and a new south branch on the Line 2 to Assago (2 stations) opened in early 2011.

The  second stage, from Zara to Garibaldi FS, opened on 1 March 2014. The  third stage, from Garibaldi FS to San Siro Stadio opened on 29 April 2015, with some intermediate stations not in service at that time; as of November 2015, all the stations have been opened.

The metro replaced several interurban tramroutes of the original Società Trazione Elettrica Lombarda (STEL) tramlines, in particular the Line 2 to Gessate.

Timeline

Infrastructure

Lines
The system comprises 5 lines. All the lines run underground except for the northern part of Line 2 and the Line 2 Assago branch.

There are 7 interchange stations, each with 2 lines: Centrale (Lines 2 and 3), also Milan's main train station; Duomo (Lines 1 and 3), considered the center of the city; Loreto (Lines 1 and 2); Cadorna (Lines 1 and 2), city terminus for northbound suburban and regional railways; Zara (Lines 3 and 5); Garibaldi (Lines 2 and 5), also a major railway station; Lotto (Lines 1 and 5).

Lines run in the Milan municipality for 80% of the total length (93 stations). Beside Milan, 12 other neighbouring municipalities are served: Assago, Bussero, Cassina de' Pecchi, Cernusco sul Naviglio, Cologno Monzese, Gessate, Gorgonzola, Pero, Rho, San Donato Milanese, Sesto San Giovanni, Vimodrone. The network covers about 20% of Milan's total area.

The metro network is also linked with the suburban rail service, with 14 interchange stations: Affori FN, Cadorna FN, Domodossola, Garibaldi FS, Lambrate FS, Lodi T.I.B.B. (with the nearby Porta Romana station), Porta Venezia, Repubblica, Rho Fiera, Rogoredo FS, Romolo, Sesto 1º Maggio, Dateo and Forlanini 

Most of the network has no platform screen doors, except for the newest Line 5, where screen doors are present in all stations and some stations on Line 1.

Network Map

Power supply

Lines 2 and 3 use overhead lines to supply the electric current to the train and are electrified at 1500 V DC. Line 1, electrified at 750 V DC, uses a fourth rail system, although the same line also supports overhead lines in some stretches and depots; this allows Line 2 and 3 trains to use Line 1 tracks to reach a depot placed on the line. Line 5 trains are supplied by a third rail system at 750 V DC, and the same system will be used on the future line 4.

Signalling

Passenger information

All the stations are provided with LED screens showing the destination and waiting time of coming trains. In every station, a recorded voice announces the direction of every approaching train and, at the platform, the name of the station. While older trains have no on-train information, the new Meneghino and Leonardo trains and the driverless trains on Line 5 are equipped with displays and recorded announcements in Italian and in English.

Mobile phone coverage
Since December 2009 all stations and trains of the Milan metro have full UMTS and HSDPA connectivity. Mobile operators TIM and Vodafone also provide LTE connectivity in all lines.

Rolling stock

The first 3 lines are heavy rapid-transit lines, with 6-cars trains, about 105 m in length. Line 4 and Line 5 are light metro lines, with 4-cars trains, about 50 m long. Line 4 and Line 5 are equipped with driverless trains.

Service

Tickets

A standard ticket costs €2.20 and is valid for 90 minutes since its validation on metro, tram, bus, trolleybus and suburban lines within Milan and 21 bordering municipalities. Other tickets are available as well, such as daily, weekly, monthly, annual, student and senior passes. Additional fares are required to travel outside Milan and the 21 bordering municipalities.

Paper tickets can be substituted by contactless bank cards payments, provided the trip starts in the metro, by tapping in the orange gates installed in every metro station. This payment method is not available on suburban lines; it was expected to be implemented on trams and buses starting by the end of 2019; it was eventually introduced in December 2020 on three urban bus lines, with plans for coverage on all the network by 2023.

Between 2004 and 2007 ATM introduced Itinero smartcard, a proximity card which can be charged with season tickets, replacing paper for this type of tickets. At the beginning of 2010, a new smartcard, RicaricaMi, was introduced. The new card can be charged up with credit and can be used for travel in place of magnetic paper tickets, on the model of London's Oyster card.

Milan metro lines can be accessed also with the regional integrated ticket "Io viaggio ovunque in Lombardia", as 1 to 7 days tickets or longer subscriptions using the smartcard "Io Viaggio".

Opening hours
The service starts at about 5:40 am and ends at about 0:30. 
During Sundays and holidays service usually starts later and ends later, depending on the occasion.

Headways at peak hours vary from 2 minutes on the Line 1 (central part) to 3 minutes on Line 3. On branch lines (of lines 1 and 2) the headway is usually double.

Night service
A night service has operated since 2015 with buses. 
The bus service follows the same route and stops at the same stations of the metro.
The entire lines 1 and 3 and the urban section of line 2 (Abbiategrasso-Cascina Gobba) are covered by the service.

The future network

The metro system is currently expanding. 
An extension of Line 1 from Sesto 1º Maggio to Cinisello/Monza, towards the city of Cinisello Balsamo, is currently under construction. 
The completion has been delayed several times, and is now scheduled for 2024.
There is a proposal for a further 3 km extension of Line 1 to the west.

An extension of Line 2 from Cologno Nord to Vimercate is planned. 
The track will be mostly underground (83%).

Line 3 is planned to be extended to the south-east from San Donato to Paullo:  with intermediate stations in the city of San Donato, Peschiera Borromeo, Mediglia, Caleppio Cerca, Paullo and Paullo East, the first 3 being underground and the other on the surface. The project is currently on hold.

The new Line 4 will run from the western suburb of Lorenteggio to the eastern side of the city to Linate Airport, and is expected to open in 2022. 
The line has been approved by the Italian Government in March 2006, and funded in November 2009. 
Preliminary prospections began in mid-2010, and construction started in late 2011. 
The construction of the whole line was approved by the city of Milan in November 2014.
Line 4 trains will be completely automatic and driverless, employing AnsaldoBreda Driverless Metro trains as in Line 5.

Line 4 will feature interchange stations with other M lines at Sant'Ambrogio (Line 2), Sforza/Policlinico (with an underground link to Line 3 through Missori or Crocetta), San Babila (Line 1), and with suburban lines at San Cristoforo FS, Dateo and Forlanini FS.

See also

Signalling of the Milan Metro
Transport in Milan
Azienda Trasporti Milanesi
Milan S Lines
List of metro systems
Lists of rapid transit systems

References

External links

ATM - Milan's Transportation Company
Metropolitana Milanese S.p.A. - the company that built the Metro
Milano Metro Map on Google earth with geolocation

 
Metro
750 V DC railway electrification
1500 V DC railway electrification
Railway lines opened in 1964
1964 establishments in Italy